Shrivardhan is one of the 288 Vidhan Sabha (Assembly) constituencies of Maharashtra state in Western India.

Members of Assembly

Election Results

2019

2009 

 
 

Assembly constituencies of Maharashtra
Politics of Raigad district